Junchu Town(), is an urban town in Liling City, Zhuzhou City, Hunan Province, People's Republic of China.

Cityscape
The town is divided into 17 villages and 2 communities, the following areas: Jinshan Community, Junchuqiao Community, Zhoufang Village, Zhangqiao Village, Laowan Village, Qingshan Village, Junshan Village, Lipotang Village, Dalongzhou Village, Daixingqiao Village, Panjiachong Village, Zhaogongling Village, Majialong Village, Heyeba Village, Changling'ao Village, Rixinqiao Village, Huangtian Village, and Huanggu Village.

References

External links

Divisions of Liling